Kagiso Kumbane (born 21 November 1988) is a track and field sprint athlete who competes internationally for South Africa.

Kumbane represented South Africa at the 2008 Summer Olympics in Beijing. He competed at the 4x100 metres relay together with Leigh Julius, Thuso Mpuang and Hannes Dreyer. In their qualification heat they did not finish due to a mistake in the baton exchange and they were eliminated.

Personal Best – Outdoor 
Performance Wind Place Date 
100 Metres 10.35 1.80 Pretoria 27 March 2008 
200 Metres 20.64 0.60 Pretoria 28 March 2008 
Progression – Outdoor 
Season Performance Wind Place Date 
100 Metres 2008 10.35 1.80 Pretoria 27 March 2008 
2007 10.42 -0.20 Pretoria 13 April 2007 
2006 10.65 Pretoria 7 April 2006 
200 Metres 2009 20.92 0.60 Stellenbosch 4 April 2009 
2008 20.64 0.60 Pretoria 28 March 2008 
2007 20.75 Gaborone 5 April 2007 
2006 21.18 0.20 Pretoria 8 April 2006 
2005 21.48 0.40 Marrakech 16 July 2005 
Honours 
Rank Performance Wind Place Date 
200 Metre||s 
11th IAAF World Junior Championships 3 h 21.71 -0.60 Beijing (Chaoyang Sport Center) 17 August 2006 
4th IAAF World Youth Championships 3 sf 21.78 1.20 Marrakech 16 July 2005

References

External links
 Athletes

1988 births
Living people
South African male sprinters
Olympic athletes of South Africa
Athletes (track and field) at the 2008 Summer Olympics
Universiade medalists in athletics (track and field)
Universiade bronze medalists for South Africa
20th-century South African people
21st-century South African people